Giuseppe "Beppe" Pisanu (born 2 January 1937 in Ittiri, province of Sassari) is an Italian politician, longtime member of the Chamber of Deputies for the Christian Democracy (1972–1992) and then for Forza Italia (1994–2006).

Biography 

Pisanu graduated in Agricultural sciences from the University of Sassari.
He was the top-aide to Benigno Zaccagnini, leader of the left-wing of the Christian Democracy and national secretary of the party from 1975 to 1980. He served as Under-secretary of State for Treasury from 1980 and 1983 and as Under-secretary of State for Defense from 1986 to 1989.

In 1994 he joined Forza Italia, of which he was Vice-President (1994–96) and President of faction (1996–2001) in the Chamber of Deputies. In 2001 he was appointed Minister for the Implementation of the Government Program in the Berlusconi II government. Subsequently, from 2002 to 2006, he served as Minister of the Interior in the second and third Berlusconi government. He was also the president of the Antimafia Commission from 2008 to 2013.

The P2-Banco Ambrosiano scandal 
In 1983 Pisanu was forced to resign as an undersecretary for the P2 scandal, for his relations with Flavio Carboni, with Roberto Calvi, and with the Banco Ambrosiano crack. According to MPs Sergio Flamigni and Michele Caccavale, in the early 80s Pisanu, then Undersecretary of the Treasury, was the political godfather of Flavio Carboni, Sardinian hustler in relations with members of the Mafia and with members of the Magliana Gang, and in business with Silvio Berlusconi.

Pisanu was not investigated by the judiciary for the scandal, but only heard as a person informed of the facts. Listened several times by the Anselmi commission, he will admit that he has somewhat "underestimated" the delicacy of certain acquaintances.

Honours and awards 
 : Knight Grand Cross of the Sacred Military Constantinian Order of Saint George

References

External links

Giuseppe Pisanu at La Repubblica
Giuseppe Pisanu at Radio Radicale

1937 births
Living people
People from the Province of Sassari
The People of Freedom politicians
21st-century Italian politicians
Christian Democracy (Italy) politicians
20th-century Italian politicians
Forza Italia politicians
Italian Ministers of the Interior
University of Sassari alumni